Nannet Kiemel (born 4 June 1969) is a Dutch bobsledder. She competed in the two woman event at the 2002 Winter Olympics.

References

1969 births
Living people
Dutch female bobsledders
Olympic bobsledders of the Netherlands
Bobsledders at the 2002 Winter Olympics
Sportspeople from Deventer
21st-century Dutch women